Piotr Włodzimierz Gąsowski (born 16 April 1964, in Mielec) is a Polish actor, comedian and presenter. He appeared in the  television series Aby do świtu... in 1992.

References

1964 births
Living people
People from Mielec
Polish comedians
Polish male television actors
Polish television presenters
20th-century Polish male actors